Svodín is a village and municipality in the Nové Zámky District in the Nitra Region of south-west Slovakia.

Geography
The municipality lies at an altitude of 202 metres and covers an area of 53.606 km2.

History
In historical records the village was first mentioned in 1416. The town had a Hungarian majority as early as the 17th century, according to the Turkish tax census.
After the Austro-Hungarian army disintegrated in November 1918, Czechoslovak troops occupied the area, later acknowledged internationally by the Treaty of Trianon. Between 1938 and 1945 Svodín once more became part of Miklós Horthy's Hungary through the First Vienna Award. From 1945 until the Velvet Divorce, it was part of Czechoslovakia. Since then it has been part of Slovakia.

Sights 

 Archeological Museum - The archeologists of the Slovak National Museum excavated the remains of the damaged Saint Michael's church and an even older church standing on its place, between the years 1995 and 2001. They found interesting and edifying things, so the local government decided to show the findings to the public in the form of an exhibition. They have bought an other building next to the Folk-house. It is a ground-floor building with three rooms where the visitors can follow the systematized results of the researches. 
 Art Gallery of Svodín - The first year of the International Creativ Art Camp had been organised in the village in the year 1999. Since then artists representing various creative styles, from several states (Slovakia, Hungary, Czech Republic, Poland, Romania, Canada) meet here every year.
 Church of the Assumption - This Roman Catholic church is the centre of religious life and its most important monument built in baroque style. It was sanctified in the year 1799 in honour of the Virgin Mary. It was damaged during the Second World War and rebuilt in 1957. Its interior was renewed in the years 1968 and at the end of the 80's. 
 St. Michael's Church - Several historical sources prove that the first church of the village already existed in the 13th century, but the exact date of its building is unknown. This church with two towers, built in roman style, got several shots in the last month of the Second World War and later it was intentionally damaged. The retreating German military units had blown it up on 28 March 1945, except the sanctuary both towers and the aisle had been totally ruined. Today visitors maybe find their peace of mind among the ruins, in the cool shadow of the trees, in front of the open-air altar with a Calvary around.
The Monument of the Victims of World War I. - The statue of heroes was erected in 1924 in honor of the victims of World War I.
Statue of Pál Pathó - He was born into a noble family on June 7, 1795, in Mužla, Slovakia. His father was János Pathó, his mother was Borbála Németh. He was the deputy judge of Esztergom county and the clerk of the village of Svodín. In 1848 he was the organizer of the local national guard. He died on April 28, 1855, in a pneumonia chest in Svodín. His grave can be viewed at the local cemetery.
Educational trail from Strekov to Svodín - The starting and ending point of the educational trail is the Roman Catholic church of the two village. The length of the educational trail is 9.3 km. Every 50 metres of the route is a tourist sign according to the educational trail standard, and a total of 12 direction signs were installed. There are a total of 6 large (1.8 m x 1.2 m) information boards along the educational trail. In terms of content, it points out the valuable flora and fauna of the area, introduces the Cigléd pilgrimage site, presents the folk traditions and cultural-historical values of the two villages, as well as the Central European Way of Mary.

Population
It has a population of about 2,625 people, which is about 78% Hungarian, 20% Slovak and 2% Romany.

Facilities
The village has a small public library, a gym, and a football pitch. It also has a DVD rental store.

Twin towns — sister cities

Svodín is twinned with:
 Bystřice, Czech Republic
 Pińczów, Poland
 Tata, Hungary

References

External links
 http://www.statistics.sk/mosmis/eng/run.html
 Svodín – Nové Zámky Okolie
https://www.visitdanube.eu/en/sights-7

Villages and municipalities in Nové Zámky District